This is a list of the French SNEP Top 100 Singles number-ones of 1993.

Summary

Singles Chart

See also
1993 in music
List of number-one hits (France)
List of artists who reached number one on the French Singles Chart

References

1993 in French music
1993 record charts
Lists of number-one songs in France